Moorsele Airfield  is a recreational airfield located in Moorsele, a village in the municipality of Wevelgem in Belgium. It is operated by Vliegveld Moorsele VZW and was formerly operated by the Belgian Air Component. It is mainly used as a light general aviation field for ULM and parachuting activities.

See also 
List of airports in Belgium

References

External links 
 Airfield guide (PDF)
 Local airclub (in Dutch language) 

Belgian airbases
Airports in West Flanders